The pied cuckoo-dove (Reinwardtoena browni) is a bird species in the family Columbidae. It is endemic to the Bismarck Archipelago.

Formerly classified as a species of least concern by the IUCN, it was suspected to be rarer than generally assumed. Following the evaluation of its population size, this was found to be correct, and it is consequently uplisted to near-threatened status in 2008.

References

 BirdLife International (BLI) (2008): http://www.birdlife.org/action/science/species/global_species_programme/whats_new.html 2008 IUCN Redlist status changes. Retrieved 2008-MAY-23.

pied cuckoo-dove
Birds of the Bismarck Archipelago
pied cuckoo-dove
pied cuckoo-dove
Taxonomy articles created by Polbot